La Imperial may refer to:

 La Imperial, Chile or Antigua [Old] Imperial, a city and former bishopric
 Nueva Imperial, a city 20km from Antigua Imperial